Irving Loeb Goldberg (June 29, 1906 – February 11, 1995) was a United States circuit judge of the United States Court of Appeals for the Fifth Circuit.

Education and career

Born in Port Arthur, Texas, Goldberg received a Bachelor of Arts degree from the University of Texas at Austin in 1926 and a Bachelor of Laws from Harvard Law School in 1929. He was in private practice in Beaumont, Texas in 1929, in Houston, Texas in 1930, and in Taylor, Texas in 1931. He was an in-house counsel at The Murray Company in Dallas, Texas from 1932 to 1934, returning to private practice in Dallas from 1934 to 1942. He was a United States Naval Reserve Lieutenant during World War II from 1942 to 1946. He was thereafter again in private practice in Dallas until 1966, becoming lead name partner at Goldberg, Fonville, Gump & Strauss (now Akin Gump Strauss Hauer & Feld).

Federal judicial service

On June 28, 1966, Goldberg was nominated by President Lyndon B. Johnson to a new seat on the United States Court of Appeals for the Fifth Circuit created by 80 Stat. 75. He was confirmed by the United States Senate on July 22, 1966, and received his commission the same day. He assumed senior status on January 31, 1980, and served in that capacity until his death on February 11, 1995, in Dallas. Judge Goldberg authored the case Zatarains, Inc. v. Oak Grove Smokehouse, Inc. 698 F.2d 786 (5th Cir. 1983), a leading case in trademark law.

References

Sources
 

1906 births
1995 deaths
People from Port Arthur, Texas
Military personnel from Texas
University of Texas at Austin alumni
Harvard Law School alumni
Judges of the United States Court of Appeals for the Fifth Circuit
United States court of appeals judges appointed by Lyndon B. Johnson
20th-century American judges
United States Navy officers
United States Navy reservists
20th-century American naval officers